The Methylobacterium-1 RNA motif is a conserved RNA structure discovered using bioinformatics.  Almost all known examples of this RNA are found in DNA extracted from marine bacteria.  However, one instance is predicted in Methylobacterium sp. 4-46, a species of alphaproteobacteria.  The motif is presumed to function as a non-coding RNA.

References

External links 
 

Non-coding RNA